Events in the year 1959 in Mexico.

Incumbents

Federal government
 President: Adolfo López Mateos
 Interior Secretary (SEGOB): Gustavo Díaz Ordaz
 Secretary of Foreign Affairs (SRE): Manuel Tello Baurraud
 Communications Secretary (SCT): Walter Cross Buchanan
 Education Secretary (SEP): José Ángel Ceniceros
 Secretary of Defense (SEDENA): Matias Ramos
 Secretary of Navy: Manuel Zermeño Araico
 Secretary of Labor and Social Welfare: Salomón González Blanco

Supreme Court

 President of the Supreme Court: Alfonso Guzmán Neyra

Governors
Every governor was a member of the Institutional Revolutionary Party, PRI.

 Aguascalientes: Luis Ortega Douglas
 Baja California
Braulio Maldonado Sández (until November 12, 1959)Eligio Esquivel Méndez (starting November 13, 1959)
 Campeche: Alberto Trueba Urbina
 Chiapas: Samuel León Brindis
 Chihuahua: Teófilo Borunda
 Coahuila: Raúl Madero González
 Durango: Francisco González de la Vega
 Guanajuato: J. Jesús Rodríguez Gaona
 Guerrero: Raúl Caballero Aburto
 Hidalgo: Alfonso Corona del Rosal
 Jalisco
Agustín Yáñez (until February 28, 1959)Juan Preciado (starting March 1, 1959)
 State of Mexico: Gustavo Baz Prada
 Michoacán: David Franco Rodríguez 
 Morelos: Norberto López Avelar
 Nayarit: José Limón Guzmán
 Nuevo León: José S. Vivanco
 Oaxaca: Alfonso Pérez Gasca
 Puebla: Fausto M. Ortega
 Querétaro: Juan C. Gorraéz
 San Luis Potosí
Agustín Olivo Monsiváis (Interim)Francisco Martínez De La Vega (Substitute)
 Sinaloa: Gabriel Leyva Velásquez
 Sonora: Álvaro Obregón Tapia
 Tabasco: Carlos A. Madrazo
 Tamaulipas: Norberto Treviño Zapata
 Tlaxcala: Joaquín Cisneros Molina
 Veracruz: Antonio María Quirasco
 Yucatán: Agustín Franco Aguilar
 Zacatecas: Francisco E. García
Regent of the Federal District: Ernesto P. Uruchurtu

Events
 January 1
The Institute for Social Security and Services for State Workers (ISSSTE) is formed. 
President Adolfo López Mateos informs the nation that three Mexican fishermen were killed and 14 wounded by the Armed Forces of Guatemala on December 31, 1958.
January 2 – The Foreign Ministry of Guatemala declares that the three Mexican fishermen killed on December 31, 1958, were "pirates."
February 12 – Martín Luis Guzmán is named president of the Comisión Nacional de Libros de Texto Gratuitos (Commission of Free Textbooks, CONALITEG) to provide books for elementary schools.
May 23 – Pope John XXIII creates the dioceses of Diócesis de Tlaxcala and San Andrés Tuxtla.
 August 12 – The Mexican Academy of Sciences is founded.
 September 10 – MASA is founded when the state-owned investment bank, SOMEX acquired the private company, Sheppard Hnos.
September 15 – Cry of Dolores: President López Mateos announces the reestablishment of diplomatic relations with Guatemala.
 October 10 – The Autonomous University of Zacatecas is established.
 October 23 to 29 – 1959 Mexico hurricane: An estimated 1,500 people died, principally in Colima.
Date unknown – The motorcycle club Solo Angeles is formed.

Awards
Belisario Domínguez Medal of Honor – Heriberto Jara Corona

Film

 List of Mexican films of 1959

Births
April 16 – Gran Apache, wrestler (d. 2017).
May 27 – Andrés Bustamante ("El Güiri Güiri"), comedian and author.
May 24 – José Trinidad Zapata Ortiz, Bishop of the Roman Catholic Diocese of Papantla (starting 2014).
August 27 — Daniela Romo, actress, singer, TV host
September 6 — Fernando Ciangherotti, soap opera actor
September 30 — Miguel Barbosa Huerta, Governor of Puebla starting 2019 (d. 2022).
October 5 — Ernesto Laguardia, soap opera actor
October 7 – Brazo de Oro (wrestler) (d. 2017)
October 10 — Marcelo Ebrard, politician (PRD) and Mayor of Mexico City 2006-2012; Secretary of Foreign Affairs starting 2018.
November 16 — Rafael Flores, soccer player (defender) who played for Mexico in the 1986 FIFA World Cup; (d. 2018)
November 25 — José Antonio Gali Fayad, Governor of Puebla 2017-2018
December 17 – Felicia Mercado, actress.
 Date unknown
Agustín Bernal, actor (d. 2018).
Tedi López Mills, poet.
Fernando Maiz Garza, businessman, builder, and philanthropist (d. 2017).
Gustavo Nakatani Ávila ("Yoshio"), singer (d. 2020)

Deaths
June 30 — José Vasconcelos, writer, philosopher, and politician (b. 1882)
July 30 – María Natividad Venegas de la Torre ("María of Jesus in the Blessed Sacrament"), 90, Roman Catholic nun, first female Mexican saint.
December 27 — Alfonso Reyes, writer, philosopher, and diplomat (b. 1889)

Sport

 1958–59 Mexican Primera División season 
 The Tecolotes de Nuevo Laredo win the Mexican League
 Mexico ends up 3rd out of 4 during the Panamerican Championship 1960 in Costa Rica.
 Club San Sebastián de León dissolves.

See also
Mexico–Guatemala conflict

References